The western pygmy blue (Brephidium exilis or Brephidium exile) is one of the smallest butterflies in the world and the smallest in North America. It has reached Hawaii, as well as the Persian Gulf, including eastern Saudi Arabia, Bahrain and the United Arab Emirates.

Description
The upperside is copper brown with dull blue at the bases of both wings. The underside of the hindwing is copper brown with white at the base; the fringe mostly white, with 3 small black spots near base, and a row of black spots at outer margin. The wingspan is 12–20 mm.

Biology
Males establish a territory in which they look for receptive females to mate with. After mating, females lay eggs on all parts of the host plant, oftenmost on the uppersides of leaves. The caterpillars eat all parts of the plant; host species include Pigweed (Chenopodium album), saltbush species (Atriplex), and others in the goosefoot family (Chenopodiaceae). Adult imagos appear in July–September in the north, while it appears year round in South Texas. Adults feed on nectar only.

Distribution and habitat
This butterfly can be found in alkaline areas such as deserts, salt marshes, and barren areas. They are common across their natural range, which includes the Southwestern United States from California eastwards to west Texas, and from Mexico to Venezuela. It may migrate to Arkansas, Nebraska, and Oregon. Its introduced range includes the United Arab Emirates, Bahrain, and eastern Saudi Arabia along the Persian Gulf coast up to Kuwait.

Subspecies
There are four subspecies:
Brephidium exilis exilis (Texas, New Mexico, Arizona, Nevada, California, Mexico, New Orleans to Florida, Georgia)
Brephidium exilis isophthalma (Herrich-Schäffer, 1862) (Cuba, Jamaica, Hispaniola, Bahamas)
Brephidium exilis thompsoni (Carpenter & Lewis, 1943) (Grand Cayman)
Brephidium exilis yucateca  (Yucatan peninsula)

Images

References

Brephidium
Butterflies of North America
Butterflies of South America
Butterflies described in 1852